Established in 1981, the Film Academy of the Philippines (FAP) is the Philippines' official counterpart of the United States' Academy of Motion Picture Arts and Sciences. The FAP was founded through Executive Order 640-A issued by the President of the Philippines. The academy serves as the umbrella organization of various guilds of the movie industry that organize and supervise activities to optimize competency. The FAP gives recognition and awards to film artists, technicians and workers for their outstanding performances and achievements. The Film Academy of the Philippines Awards, shortened as the FAP Awards, have been given since 1983. The purpose of the 1983 award ceremony was to honor film achievements in 1982. In 2005, the name of the award was officially changed into Luna Awards.

Guilds

 Assistant Directors and Production Managers Association for Motion Pictures
 Filipino Society of Cinematographers
 Katipunan ng mga Artistang Pilipino sa Pelikula at Telebisyon
 Motion Picture Audio Society of the Philippines
 Movie Producers and Distributors Association of the Philippines
 Movie Workers Welfare Foundation
 Philippine Motion Picture Directors Association
 Philippine Motion Picture Producers Association
 Pilipino Musical Directors Association 
 Production Designers Guild of the Philippines
 Screenwriters Guild of the Philippines
 United Film Editors Guild for Motion Picture

See also
Film awards bodies in the Philippines

References

External links

Philippine film awards
Professional associations based in the Philippines
Organizations established in 1981
Film-related professional associations
Film organizations in the Philippines
1981 establishments in the Philippines
Establishments by Philippine executive order